Venus of the South Seas, also known as Venus of the Southern Seas, is a 1924 silent drama film directed by James R. Sullivan starring swimmer Annette Kellerman. It was one of the last films with footage in the Prizma Color process.

The 55-minute four-reel film, made by an American company and shot in Nelson, New Zealand. It includes substantial footage taking place underwater. The film, with the final reel in Prizmacolor, was restored by the Library of Congress in 2004.

Plot 

The daughter of a man who owns a South Seas pearl business falls in love with a wealthy traveler. Her father dies, leaving her the business, but a greedy ship captain schemes to take the business from her.

Cast
Annette Kellerman as Shona Royal
Roland Purdie as John Royal
Norman French as Captain John Drake 
Robert Ramsey as Robert Quane

References

Other sources
New Zealand Film 1912-1996 by Helen Martin & Sam Edwards, p. 33 (1997, Oxford University Press, Auckland)

External links

Tinted and toned images at filmcolors.org

1924 films
1920s color films
Films shot in New Zealand
American silent feature films
Films set in Oceania
New Zealand silent films
Silent films in color
Films about mermaids
1920s rediscovered films
1924 drama films
Rediscovered American films
Early color films
1920s American films
Silent horror films